Ruckcroft is a hamlet in the English county of Cumbria. It neighbours the larger settlements of Armathwaite and Ainstable. In the past Ruckcroft had a pub but this is now a private home.

See also

Listed buildings in Ainstable

Hamlets in Cumbria
Ainstable